Border crossings in the Republic of Albania are defined as boundary checkpoints that serve to control  the flow of people and goods from neighbouring countries to and from Albania. These checkpoints are administered by the border police authorities that record the entry and exit of each person and vehicle followed by the customs authorities that record the entry and exit of goods and cash. Albania currently has 22 operational land border crossings and shares borders with Montenegro, Kosovo (116.3 km), North Macedonia (186.1 km), and Greece. 
This article outlines a complete list of Albania's international border crossings, including land, sea and air entry points.

History
During the communist period in Albania, very few people were allowed to leave the country (usually only diplomats) and would also be required to have written permission to do so. Visitors entering the country from outside for any reason, tourism or otherwise, were immediately suspect and closely monitored. Escaping the country was practically impossible with electric fencing, guard dogs and border police instructed to shoot at will if they saw citizens fleeing across the border.

Land border crossings

Muriqan (Shkodër) – Sukobin, Ulqin
 Han i Hotit (Malësi e Madhe) – Božaj (Podgorica, the main border crossing)*
 Bashkim, Vermosh – Karaula, Vjeternik (Guci)
 Grabom (Malësi e Madhe) – Cem i Trieshit (Cijevna), Podgorica
 planned border crossings:
 Zogaj (Shkodër) – Hutaj (Skje), Bar
 Qafë Vranicë (Tropojë) – Plav

Qafë Morinë (Tropojë) – Gjakovë
 Qafë Prush (Has) – Gjakovë
 Morinë (Kukës) – Vërmicë (Prizren, the main border crossing)*
 Orgjost (Kukës) – Orqushë (pedestrian only, not frequently used)
 Borje – Glloboçicë
 Shishtavec (Kukës) – Dragash (opened as normal border crossing on May 10, 2013)

Bllatë (Dibër) – Spas (Debar)
 Trebisht (Dibër) – Džepište (Debar)
 Qafë Thanë (Pogradec) – Kjafasan (Struga, the main border crossing)*
 Tushemisht (Pogradec) – Sveti Naum (Ohrid)
 Goricë (Pustec) – Stenje (Resen)

Kapshticë (Devoll) – Krystallopigi  (Prespes, important border crossing)
 Tre Urat (Përmet) – Melissopetra (Konitsa)
 Sopik (Dropull) – Drymades (Pogoni, pedestrian only, not frequently used)
 Kakavijë – Ktismata  (Pogoni, the main border crossing)*
 Rips (Finiq) – Ampelonas (Filiates, pedestrian only, not frequently used)
 Qafë Botë (Konispol) – Sagiada (Filiates)

Railway crossings

Podgorica–Shkodër railway

Pogradec–Krystallopigi railway (planned)

Maritime ports

 Port of Durrës
 Port of Vlorë 
 Port of Sarandë
 Port of Shëngjin

Airports
 Tirana International Airport (TIA)
 Kukës International Airport (KFZ)
 Vlorë International Airport (u/c)

See also
 ASIG
 Albania Border Crossings on Google Maps

References